Andriy Andriyovych Klishchuk (born 3 July 1992) is a professional Ukrainian football goalkeeper who plays for Kryvbas Kryvyi Rih.

Career
Klishchuk is a product of the Dunay Izmail and Monolit Chornomorsk Youth Sportive School Systems.

After playing in the different Ukrainian clubs in the Ukrainian Second League and the Ukrainian First League, he signed a contract with SC Dnipro-1 in June 2018 and together with this team was promoted to the Ukrainian Premier League.

References

External links

Ukrainian footballers
1992 births
Living people
People from Izmail
Ukraine student international footballers
Ukrainian Premier League players
Ukrainian First League players
Ukrainian Second League players
FC Chornomorets-2 Odesa players
FC Chornomorets Odesa players
FC Hirnyk-Sport Horishni Plavni players
PFC Sumy players
FC Nyva Vinnytsia players
FC Naftovyk-Ukrnafta Okhtyrka players
SC Dnipro-1 players
FC Krystal Kherson players
FC Inhulets Petrove players
FC Kryvbas Kryvyi Rih players
Association football goalkeepers
Sportspeople from Odesa Oblast